Carlisle London Road railway station was the first to open in Carlisle, Cumbria, England.  It was built as a terminus of the Newcastle and Carlisle Railway and opened in 1836, when trains could only run as far as Greenhead; not until 1838 was it possible to travel by rail all the way to Gateshead.

When the Lancaster and Carlisle Railway (L&C) reached Carlisle in 1846 it used London Road station for nine months as a temporary expedient before the opening of Carlisle Citadel railway station. The Maryport and Carlisle Railway (M&C) ran some trains to London Road as well as its own Carlisle station at Crown Street.  In 1849, the L&C enforced an agreement the M&C had undertaken to sell Crown Street to allow full development of Citadel; the L&C then rapidly demolished Crown Street, and the M&C used London Road as its Carlisle terminus until 1851, after which its trains ran to Citadel.

The Newcastle and Carlisle was amalgamated with the North Eastern Railway (NER) in 1862; the following year, passenger services to London Road ceased, the Newcastle service now running to Citadel. London Road continued to operate as a goods station for the NER.

It was situated just off London Road, and trains of the Settle-Carlisle Line and the Tyne Valley Line still pass immediately to the south of the site of the former station.

References

Disused railway stations in Cumbria
Former North Eastern Railway (UK) stations
Railway stations in Great Britain opened in 1836
Railway stations in Great Britain closed in 1863
Buildings and structures in Carlisle, Cumbria